Sugar Loaf Dam is a dam in Lake County of mid-Colorado,  west of Leadville.

The earthen dam was one of five reservoir dams completed from 1965 to 1968 by the United States Bureau of Reclamation as part of the larger water diversion project named the Fryingpan-Arkansas Project. The project was authorized in 1962 by President Kennedy and was completed in 1981.

The Fry-Ark diverts water across the continental divide from the Colorado River basin. This water is delivered to the more arid plains east of the Rocky Mountains. Although the predominant use is agricultural, some water is available to several cities east of the continental divide, including: Colorado Springs, Pueblo, La Junta, Lamar. Water is diverted from the West Slope's Fryingpan River basin through a series of interconnected tunnels and small diversion dams into the Charles H. Boustead Tunnel. The Boustead runs water underneath the Continental Divide  before discharging it into Turquoise Lake.

Turquoise Lake is the reservoir created by the dam. The lake and its surrounding land provide various recreational activities for visitors in both the summer and winter.

References 

Dams in Colorado
Reservoirs in Colorado
United States Bureau of Reclamation dams
Buildings and structures in Lake County, Colorado
Dams completed in 1968
Bodies of water of Lake County, Colorado